Flubromazepam is a benzodiazepine derivative which was first synthesized in 1960, but was never marketed and did not receive any further attention or study until late 2012 when it appeared on the grey market as a novel designer drug.

It is a structural analog of phenazepam in which the chlorine atom has been replaced by a fluorine atom.

An alternate isomer, 5-(2-bromophenyl)-7-fluoro-1,3-dihydro-2H-1,4-benzodiazepin-2-one or "iso-flubromazepam", may have been sold under the same name.

Legal status

United Kingdom 

In the UK, flubromazepam has been classified as a Class C drug by the May 2017 amendment to The Misuse of Drugs Act 1971 along with several other designer benzodiazepine drugs.

United States 

Flubromazepam, clonazolam, and flubromazolam are Schedule I controlled substances under Virginia State Law.

See also 

 List of benzodiazepine designer drugs
 Desmethyletizolam
 Ro07-9749
 SH-I-048A
 Imidazenil (licensed)
 Phenazepam

References 

Benzodiazepines
Bromoarenes
Designer drugs
Fluoroarenes
GABAA receptor positive allosteric modulators
Hypnotics